Szare  is a village in the administrative district of Gmina Milówka, within Żywiec County, Silesian Voivodeship, in southern Poland.

The village has a population of 805.

Until 1948 Laliki (then known as Szare Gronie) was part of the village.

References

Szare